Pengilly is a surname. Notable people with the surname include:

 Adam Pengilly (born 1977), British skeleton racer 
 April Rose Pengilly (born 1988), actress and model
 Jessie Pengilly (1918–1945), Australian cyclist 
 Kirk Pengilly (born 1958), Australian musician
 Michael Pengilly (born 1950), Australian politician

See also
 Pengilly, Minnesota, unincorporated community in Minnesota